Khanlar Safaraliyev (c.1878 – 26 September 1907) was an Azerbaijani oil field worker, labor organizer, and Moslem social democrat. In 1907, he helped lead a successful strike at the Baku oil fields. Subsequently, he was shot by an assassin, Jafar (a foreman in the oil fields), and died several days later.  The Bibi Eybat District Committee of the Russian Social Democratic Labor Party declared a general two-day strike and unsuccessfully demanded that the Baku Oil & Gas Producers Association cease protecting Khanlar's murderer, and also the manager, Abuzarbek, who allegedly assisted in the assassination. 20,000 workers demonstrated at Khanlar's funeral.

Later, 29 September 1907, Joseph Stalin delivered a speech at Khanlar's graveside.

In 1938, the city of Helenendorf and the surrounding district in the Azerbaijan SSR were renamed Khanlar in honor of Khanlar Safaraliyev, though in 2008 the city was once more renamed to Goygol. Likewise, the Safaraliyev Rayon region of Azerbaijan and its main town both bore his name but the region was later abolished, and the town is now known as Samukh.

References
 Suny, Ronald Grigor (Jan. 1972) "A Journeyman for the Revolution: Stalin and the Labour Movement in Baku, June 1907-May 1908" Soviet Studies  23(3):  pp. 373–394;
 Smith, Michael G. (June 2003) "Stalin's Martyrs:The Tragic Romance of the Russian Revolution" Totalitarian Movements & Political Religions 4(1):  pp. 95 – 126;
 Stalin, Joseph V. (1908) "The Oil Owners on Economic Terrorism" the newspaper Gudok, Nos. 28, 30 and 32, (April 21, May 4 and 18, 1908),  Reprinted from the newspaper in Stalin, J.V. (1953)  Works  Volume 2, Foreign Languages Publishing House, Moscow 1953. 
 "Khanlar" Great Soviet Encyclopedia 

Trade unionists
Azerbaijani revolutionaries
Revolutionaries from the Russian Empire
Assassinated activists
1870s births
1907 deaths
Deaths by firearm in Azerbaijan
People murdered in Azerbaijan
Assassinated Azerbaijani politicians